Mountbatten 76A is a First Nations reserve near Kinogama in Sudbury District, Ontario. It is one of two reserves of the Brunswick House First Nation.

References

External links
 Canada Lands Survey System

Ojibwe reserves in Ontario
Cree reserves in Ontario
Communities in Sudbury District